Omnio is the second full-length album by Norwegian avant-garde metal band In the Woods... It was released on October 14, 1997, through Misanthropy Records.

Reception

In his review for AllMusic, Thom Jurek calls Omnio a "devastatingly beautiful marriage of prog metal, gothic texture, epic scope, and amazingly intricate, deeply moving songwriting for a tour de force that stands as one of European metal's classic recordings." He claims the album has "remained deeply influential since its initial release in 1997."

Track listing

Notes
The titles of the three tracks "Omnio? – Pre", "Omnio? – Bardo", and "Omnio? – Post" are related. Pre is a prefix used to say "before", Bardo is a Tibetan word for "intermediate state", and Post is a prefix meaning "after".

At around 6:00 of "Omnio? – Pre", female voices can be heard singing in French. The lyrics of this portion of the song are not listed in the album, however the words "j'espère que tous les autres" (meaning "I hope that everyone else") can be heard multiple times. The following three syllables are hard to understand.

In the booklet lyrics of "Weeping Willow", all the text is in lower case except for a bunch of letters. The content (if any) of this cryptographic message is still unknown.

Credits
X. Botteri
Oddvar A:M
Bjørn Harstad
Jan Ovl
C:M. Botteri
Synne Diana Soprana
Anders Kobro

References

External links
Omnio at Encyclopaedia Metallum

1997 albums
In the Woods... albums
Misanthropy Records albums
Albums by Norwegian artists